Celebration Cinema is a movie theater chain owned and operated by Studio C (formerly known as Loeks Theatres, Inc.) with headquarters in Grand Rapids, Michigan, USA. Its theaters serve the cities and surrounding areas of Grand Rapids, Lansing, Muskegon, Benton Harbor/St. Joseph, Portage/Kalamazoo, and Mount Pleasant. An average of 5.5 million customers see movies annually through Studio C's Celebration Cinemas locations.

The Grand Rapids North, Lansing, and Portage locations feature IMAX theaters. RiverTown Crossings and Lansing feature MOPIX Rear Window Technology for the deaf and hard of hearing, and most locations feature DLP Digital cinema by Christie.

In 2007, Loeks Theatres, Inc. purchased two theaters from Plano, Texas-based Cinemark. The theaters are located in RiverTown Crossings in Grandville and the Woodland Mall in Kentwood. The 20-screen theater has been renamed Celebration! Rivertown and the 14-screen theater has been renamed Celebration Woodland after their respective malls. The purchase was an effort of Loeks Theatres to continue expansion in the West Michigan area.

In 2018, Loeks Theatres, Inc changed their company name to Studio C. The name change is an effort to create a central brand name for all of its operations. The name is a homage to the former Studio 28 theater.

In March 2020, Celebration Cinema closed its theaters temporarily due to the COVID-19 pandemic.

Locations
Studio C's corporate building is located in the Celebration! North theater based in Grand Rapids. Grand Rapids also hosts two other theaters as well and formerly hosted discounted theater that sells movie tickets for $5.00 per ticket at the Woodland Mall. Benton Harbor/St. Joseph, Lansing, Portage/Kalamazoo, Mount Pleasant, and Okemos are serviced by Celebration Cinemas as well.

Celebration theaters North Grand Rapids, Lansing, and Portage have been built with IMAX theaters.

On November 14, 2008, Celebration Cinema announced that Studio 28 would close on November 23. Studio 28 opened in 1965 with just one screen. It quickly expanded and in 1988 it became the largest movie theater in the world with 20 screens. It remained the largest theater until 1995. At one point the theater brought in 1.7 million visitors per year. Before its closing, it had been about 25% of that amount.

In December 2012 the 6-screen Studio C! opened in Okemos. The theater features reserved seating, along with made-to-order food and drinks (including beer and wine) ordered and served from patron's seats. Celebration! Cinema continued its expansion with the addition of enhanced food and beverage options at their Benton Harbor, Muskegon, Kalamazoo and Grand Rapids locations.

Studio C has constructed a new complex in downtown Grand Rapids called Studio Park. The complex will feature a 9-screen theater, parking garage, apartments and a shopping plaza. Studio Park broke ground in April 2018, with expected completion originally planned for Fall 2019. In reality, it was completed mid-2020.

In Spring of 2020, it was announced Celebration Woodland would not reopen after theaters would be allowed to reopen, citing declining traffic prior to the shutdown. This could have been partially due to the fact it primarily showed films whose theatrical runs were ending or already had ended, and the fact unlike the Rivertown location, it was in a standalone building requiring a short walk outside to get to the nearest entrance, while the Rivertown location is directly integrated into the mall.

See also
Jack Loeks

References

External links
Celebration! Cinema Website
 Celebration! North images on Cinematour

Movie theatre chains in the United States
Companies based in Grand Rapids, Michigan